The Niutta family was an Italian noble family of Albanian origin, holding the titles of Duke and Marquis of Marescotti. They resided in Potenza, Basilicata region, as well as Naples in Campania, regions of Southern Italy. The family emigrated from Albania in the 14th Century together with other noble families as the Ottoman Empire expanded across the Balkans and transplanted to Calabria. The family was awarded the title of Duke since 1722 and held the title of Marquis of Marescotti since 1719.

Among the most important members of the family are:

 Vincenzo Niutta - magistrate and jurist, senator and minister of the Kingdom of Italy. 
 Giovanni Niutta - Duke, marquis of Marescotti and Mayor of Naples from 23 January 1934 to 10 July 1936, awarded the Order of the Crown of Italy as well as the Order of Saints Maurice and Lazarus . 
 Ugo Niutta - Italian WW1 aviator and officer, decorated with the Italian Gold Medal of Military Valor.

References

Albanian noble families
Italian noble families